Puerto Rico Senatorial District I, also known as the Senatorial District of San Juan, is one of the eight senatorial districts of Puerto Rico. It is currently represented by Nitza Morán (from the New Progressive Party).

District profile

The Senatorial District I covers all of the capital city of San Juan, as well as Aguas Buenas, and some regions of Guaynabo. It has an approximate population of 462,035.

In previous distributions, the territory covered by the Senatorial District I has changed. Originally, the District only covered the capital city of San Juan. In the 1983 redistribution, the San Juan sector of Sabana Llana was assigned to the District of Carolina, but was reassigned to San Juan again in 1991.

In the 2002 redistribution, some regions of Guaynabo were assigned to the district, and in the most recent redistribution (2011), the municipality of Aguas Buenas was also assigned to the district.

Election results

2016

|-
! style="background-color:#0080FF" |
| style="width: 130px" | New Progressive Party (PNP)
|               | Henry Neumann
| 82,541
| 25.0
| 
|-
! style="background-color:#0080FF" |
| style="width: 130px" | New Progressive Party (PNP)
|               | Miguel Romero
| 80,844
| 24.5
| 
|-
! style="background-color:#FF0000" |
| style="width: 130px" | Popular Democratic Party (PPD)
|               | Ramón Luis Nieves
| 66,544
| 20.2
| 
|-
! style="background-color:#FF0000" |
| style="width: 130px" | Popular Democratic Party (PPD)
|               | Ada Álvarez Conde
| 66,368
| 20.1
| 
|-
! style="background-color:#01DF3A" |
| style="width: 130px" | Puerto Rican Independence Party (PIP)
|               | Edda I. López Serrano
| 10,681
| 3.2
| 
|-
! style="background-color:#01DF3A" |
| style="width: 130px" | Puerto Rican Independence Party (PIP)
|               | Ángel L. (Luigi) Alicea Montañez
| 10,519
| 3.2
| 
|-
! style="background-color:#800080" |
| style="width: 130px" | Worker's People Party of Puerto Rico (PPT)
|               | Maritza Stanchich
| 6,823
| 2.1
| 
|-
! style="background-color:#800080" |
| style="width: 130px" | Worker's People Party of Puerto Rico (PPT)
|               | María Gisela Rosado Almedina
| 5,771
| 1.7
|

2012

|-
! style="background-color:#FF0000" |
| style="width: 130px" | Popular Democratic Party (PPD)
|               | José Nadal Power
| 98,225
| 24.69
| 
|-
! style="background-color:#FF0000" |
| style="width: 130px" | Popular Democratic Party (PPD)
|               | Ramón Luis Nieves
| 96,378
| 24.22
| 
|-
! style="background-color:#0080FF" |
| style="width: 130px" | New Progressive Party (PNP)
|               | Zoé Laboy
| 90,102
| 22.64
| 
|-
! style="background-color:#0080FF" |
| style="width: 130px" | New Progressive Party (PNP)
|               | Liza Fernández
| 88,633
| 22.27
| 
|-
! style="background-color:#01DF3A" |
| style="width: 130px" | Puerto Rican Independence Party (PIP)
|               | Héctor J. González Pereira
| 7,530
| 1.89
| +0.35
|-
! style="background-color:#01DF3A" |
| style="width: 130px" | Puerto Rican Independence Party (PIP)
|               | Angel Alicea Montañez
| 6,969
| 1.75
| 
|-
! style="background-color:#800080" |
| style="width: 130px" | Worker's People Party of Puerto Rico (PPT)
|               | José "Pepe" Córdova
| 3,646
| 0.92
| 
|-
! style="background-color:#008080" |
| style="width: 130px" | Movimiento Unión Soberanista (MUS)
|               | Isabel Borrás Marín
| 3,310
| 0.83
| 
|-
! style="background-color:#FFBF00" |
| style="width: 130px" | Puerto Ricans for Puerto Rico Party (PPR)
|               | Fred Guillont Juarbe
| 877
| 0.22
|

2008

|-
! style="background-color:#0080FF" |
| style="width: 130px" | New Progressive Party (PNP)
|               | Roberto Arango
| 99,652
| 24.89%
| +0.67
|-
! style="background-color:#0080FF" |
| style="width: 130px" | New Progressive Party (PNP)
|               | Kimmey Raschke
| 98,897
| 24.71
| 
|-
! style="background-color:#FF0000" |
| style="width: 130px" | Popular Democratic Party (PPD)
|               | José Ortíz
| 88,781
| 22.18
| 
|-
! style="background-color:#FF0000" |
| style="width: 130px" | Popular Democratic Party (PPD)
|               | Pedro Juan Figueroa
| 86,252
| 21.55
| 
|-
! style="background-color:#FFBF00" |
| style="width: 130px" | Puerto Ricans for Puerto Rico Party (PPR)
|               | Moisés Tollinchi Padilla
| 6,672
| 1.67
| 
|-
! style="background-color:#01DF3A" |
| style="width: 130px" | Puerto Rican Independence Party (PIP)
|               | Jorge Fernández Porto
| 6,205
| 1.55
| -1.39
|-
! style="background-color:#01DF3A" |
| style="width: 130px" | Puerto Rican Independence Party (PIP)
|               | Héctor J. González Pereira
| 6,156
| 1.54
| 
|-
! style="background-color:#FFBF00" |
| style="width: 130px" | Puerto Ricans for Puerto Rico Party (PPR)
|               | Orlando Nieves Rubio
| 5,650
| 1.41
|

2004

|-
! style="background-color:#0080FF" |
| style="width: 130px" | New Progressive Party (PNP)
|               | Roberto Arango
| 101,576
| 24.22%
| 
|-
! style="background-color:#0080FF" |
| style="width: 130px" | New Progressive Party (PNP)
|               | Carlos Díaz
| 100,657
| 24.00
| 
|-
! style="background-color:#FF0000" |
| style="width: 130px" | Popular Democratic Party (PPD)
|               | Margarita Ostolaza
| 96,373
| 22.98
| -0.52
|-
! style="background-color:#FF0000" |
| style="width: 130px" | Popular Democratic Party (PPD)
|               | José Ortiz Dalliot
| 93,673
| 22.34
| -0.56
|-
! style="background-color:#01DF3A" |
| style="width: 130px" | Puerto Rican Independence Party (PIP)
|               | Jessica Martínez Birriel
| 12,966
| 3.09
| 
|-
! style="background-color:#01DF3A" |
| style="width: 130px" | Puerto Rican Independence Party (PIP)
|               | Jorge Fernández Porto
| 12,315
| 2.94
|

References

External links
Distribución de Distritos Senatoriales de Puerto Rico

Puerto Rico Senatorial districts